Jiří Hájek (6 June 1913 in Krhanice near Benešov – 22 October 1993 in Prague) was a Czech politician and diplomat. Together with Václav Havel, Zdeněk Mlynář, and Pavel Kohout, Hájek was one of the founding members and architects of Charter 77.

Early political career
Hájek studied and worked as a lawyer in the Charles University. From a young age he was a member of the Czechoslovak Social Democratic Party. During World War II Hájek was imprisoned (1939–1945). After the war he became a member of parliament for the Czechoslovak Social Democratic Party (1945–1948) and probably also a secret member of the Communist Party (code name E-22). During 1948 – 1969 he was a member of the Central Committee of the Communist Party of Czechoslovakia, during 1950 – 1953 he was the rector of the University of Economics.

Diplomacy
From 1955 Hájek worked in diplomacy: in 1955–1958 as an ambassador in Britain, in 1958–1962 as a deputy of the minister of foreign affairs, and in 1962–1965 he represented Czechoslovakia in United Nations. Between 1965 and 1968 he was the minister of education. From April to September 1968, he served as the minister of foreign affairs in Dubček's government. After the Soviet Union army took control over Czechoslovakia (21 August 1968) he protested against this in a speech at the United Nations (where he used the word occupation) – this caused his dismissal from high offices and even from the communist party (1970).

Charter 77
Until 1973 Hájek worked in the Historical Institute of Czechoslovak Academy of Sciences.

Together with Václav Havel, Zdeněk Mlynář, and Pavel Kohout, Hájek was one of the founding members and architects of Charter 77.

Jiří Hájek emerged as one of three leading spokesmen of Charter 77, thus becoming the target of police interrogations and threats. He was a strong defender of this uncompromising document, which voiced the principles of universal human rights. In 1987, Hájek was awarded the first ever Professor Thorolf Rafto Memorial Prize.

After the fall of socialism in Czechoslovakia (1989) Hájek served as an advisor of Alexander Dubček (1990–1992) but was unable to obtain significant political influence.

Death
He died of an unspecified cancer on 22 October 1993.

External links

 Biography at the Ministry of Foreign Affairs of the Czech Republic (in Czech)
 Biography (in Czech)

References 

1913 births
1993 deaths
People from Benešov District
People from the Kingdom of Bohemia
Czech Social Democratic Party politicians
National Labour Party (1938) politicians
Members of the Central Committee of the Communist Party of Czechoslovakia
Foreign ministers of Czechoslovakia
Government ministers of Czechoslovakia
Members of the Interim National Assembly of Czechoslovakia
Members of the National Assembly of Czechoslovakia (1948–1954)
Permanent Representatives of Czechoslovakia to the United Nations
Ambassadors of Czechoslovakia to the United Kingdom
Czechoslovak diplomats
Charter 77 signatories
People of the Velvet Revolution
Charles University alumni